D'Atra Hicks (born Deitra Cherelle Hicks; December 27, 1967) is an American actress and singer. Hicks is best known for her role as Jackie Simmons in Tyler Perry's 2002 stage play Madea's Family Reunion. Hicks has also performed as Nurse Trudy in the 2006 stage play What's Done in the Dark and as Niecy in the 2009 play Laugh to Keep from Crying.

Life and career
Born in Harlem, Hicks began performing in her grandfather's church choir as a child. In her early teens, Hicks and her older sister Miriam formed a singing group "The Hicks Sisters" and eventually cut a demo. The duo's demo caught the attention of Broadway producers of the stage play Mama I Want To Sing! were impressed by Hicks' voice. In late 1985, Hicks was offered the lead role of Doris Winter in the play, in which she portrayed from April 1986 until 1990. The play eventually became the most successful off-Broadway black musical in theatrical history. During her time on Broadway, Hicks received a solo deal with Capitol Records in 1989. Hicks released her self-titled debut album under the Capitol label on September 9, 1989. With production contributions from Narada Michael Walden and Nick Martinelli, Hicks' album debuted at number sixty-three and sat ten weeks on the Top R&B Albums chart. Hicks later scored roles in Tyler Perry's stage plays including Madea's Family Reunion, What's Done in the Dark.

Hicks has managed to keep her fans very entertained in the play entitled Laugh to Keep from Crying, written and directed by Tyler Perry. She played Neicey, a prostitute who is seeking to turn her life around even as she mistakenly influences Lisa. She executed a stunning performance to an audience of well over 15000 at the DeVos performance Hall. Carl Thomas of Grand Rapids compared D'atra's performance to that of real life which managed a high score rating of 3.5 out of 4 stars.

Your Husband Is Cheating On Us (2018)
In 2018, American playwright, comedian and director JD Lawrence asked Hicks to take part in a new reality show on Bravo's Your Husband is Cheating On Us. Lawrence mounts his new production of the stage play implementing unorthodox creative methods with his cast. aside from Hicks, the cast includes other performers; Ginuwine, Tondy Gallant, Lia Grant and Kristen Plati. Lawrence strategies include moving everyone into a house together and injecting real-life experiences from their lives into the script. Additionally, the behind-the-scenes drama between the cast members takes matters to another level that will either make or break the show. Helena Andrews-Deya from the Washington Post goes deep in questioning if urban theaters could cross over after Tyler Perry. Hick's was explosive in the house and at some points near physical conflicts with other roommates. In the end they all seem to pull things together to make a success of JD's production.  Similar questions were asked by others like the columnist Sesali Bowen from Refinery29. She believed that reality TV has become an unlikely champion for black subcultures in the USA. On the success of Hicks' reality show Earnest Pugh another gospel vocalist decided to release his album entitled The UnSung Hits Vol. 1 (EPM Music Group/ Entertainment One), during September 2018 which featured the soulful gospel voice of D'Atra Hicks. The album was produced by Grammy Award winner Cedric Thompson, Michael Bereal and Keith Williams.

Personal life
Hicks is the older sister of actress and singer Taral Hicks. No sources have either confirmed or denied that Hicks has ever been married. Hicks has one child, Diamond Grant with actor Tony Grant.

Divorce Court
Sources differ as to the circumstances surrounding Hicks' relationship with actor Loren Harper. Hicks and Harper appeared married on Divorce Court twice, once in September 2010 and later divorced in February 2017. A source cites their marriage as fictitious, stating that it was a comedy sketch acting scene arranged for television for the launch of the Divorce Court series.

Chart Positions

Albums

Singles

References

External links

 
 

1967 births
Actresses from New York City
20th-century African-American women singers
American contemporary R&B singers
Living people
Singers from New York City
American stage actresses
American musical theatre actresses
People from Harlem
21st-century African-American people
21st-century African-American women